Events in the year 2017 in Iraq.

Incumbents
President: Fuad Masum
Prime Minister: Haider al-Abadi
Vice President: Nouri al-Maliki, Usama al-Nujayfi, Ayad Allawi

Events
2 January – a series of suicide car bombings took place in Sadr City and behind the Kindi and Imam Ali hospitals in Baghdad, killing 56 people and injuring more than 120.
27 March – the American-led coalition conducted a bombing of the al-Aghawat al-Jadidah neighborhood in Western Mosul on 17 March 2017 that killed hundreds of civilians.
21 June – The Great Mosque of al-Nuri in Mosul was destroyed during the battle by militants of the Islamic State of Iraq and the Levant.
29 September – Iraqi government official threat to Kurdish to close a border in Northern Iraq follow vote for independence referendum.
3 October – Former President of Iraq Jalal Talabani dies in Berlin, Germany aged 83.

Deaths

October 
 October 3: Jalal Talabani, Iraqi politician, former president (born 1933)

See also
Timeline of ISIL-related events (2017)

References

 
2010s in Iraq
Years of the 21st century in Iraq
Iraq
Iraq